Bruna Esih (born 20 May 1975) is a Croatian politician and croatologist, currently serving as president of political party Independents for Croatia.

Works 
She researched Bleiburg commemoration and Battle of Vukovar as well as Yugoslav Partisan crimes after World War II in SFR Yugoslavia. She is co-author of three books as a scientist on Ivo Pilar Institute in Zagreb. She was special delegate of President Kolinda Grabar-Kitarović for Bleiburg commemorations.

 Čuvari bleiburške uspomene, Zagreb, 2003.
 Vukovar '91: međunarodni odjeci i značaj, Zagreb, 2004.
 Bleiburg Memento, Zagreb, 2005.

She has collaborated with historian Josip Jurčević.

Politics
Esih is one of the founders of the right-wing Independents for Croatia political party, which split off from the Croatian Democratic Union.

References 

1975 births
Living people
Politicians from Split, Croatia
21st-century Croatian women politicians
21st-century Croatian politicians
Writers from Split, Croatia
Croatian nationalists